Toronto—Danforth (formerly Broadview—Greenwood) is a provincial electoral district in Ontario, Canada, that has been represented in the Legislative Assembly of Ontario since 1999. It lies to the east of Downtown Toronto.

The riding is represented in the Legislative Assembly of Ontario by Peter Tabuns of the Ontario New Democratic Party (NDP).

Toronto—Danforth includes an array of ethnicities, including large Greek, Chinese, Muslim and East-Indian communities.

The northern portion of the riding, East York, tends to lean right-of-centre, while the southern half, including Riverdale, Leslieville and Riverside, usually swings to the left.

The name of the electoral district was changed in 2000 from "Broadview—Greenwood" to "Toronto—Danforth" on the suggestion of Dennis Mills, the riding's federal Member of Parliament. Many local citizens were upset at the name change, particularly due to the lack of public say in the matter.

In 2003, it was given its current boundaries, which consist of the part of the City of Toronto bounded on the south by Lake Ontario and Toronto Harbour, on the east by Coxwell Avenue and Coxwell Boulevard, on the north by Taylor Creek and the Don River East Branch, and on the west by the Don River.

History

The provincial electoral district was created in 1999 when provincial ridings were defined to have the same borders as federal ridings. It includes all of the former provincial electoral district of Riverdale, approximately 41% of the former riding of York East and 5% of the former riding of Beaches—Woodbine.

Members of Provincial Parliament

Election results

Toronto—Danforth

Broadview—Greenwood

2007 electoral reform referendum

 This riding was one of five ridings where a majority of voters supported MMP.

References

Sources
Elections Ontario Past Election Results
Map of riding for 2018 election

Provincial electoral districts of Toronto